Vibrate is the nineteenth studio album by The Manhattan Transfer. It was released on September 28, 2004 on Telarc International Corporation.

The album is available in three formats: Super Audio CD, CD, and MP3 download.

Track listing
 "Walkin' in N.Y." (Brenda Russell) - 3:55
 "Greek Song" (Rufus Wainwright) - 4:43
 "Vibrate" (Rufus Wainwright) - 4:30
 "The New JuJu Man (Tutu)" (Marcus Miller, Jon Hendricks) - 5:43
 "Doodlin'" (Horace Silver) - 5:26
 "The Twelfth" (John Yano) - 4:13
 "First Ascent" (Billy Hulting, Bob Mair, Alan Paul) - 5:31
 "Core of Sound" (Modinha) (Antônio Carlos Jobim, Vinicius de Moraes, Alan Paul) - 4:58
 "Feel Flows" (Jack Rieley, Carl Wilson) - 5:09
 "Embraceable You" (George Gershwin, Ira Gershwin) - 4:11
 "Come Softly to Me / I Met Him on a Sunday" (Gretchen Christopher, Barbara Ellis, Gary Troxel / Shirley Owens, Addie "Micki" Harris, Beverly Lee, Gary Troxel) - 4:39

Personnel 
The Manhattan Transfer
 Cheryl Bentyne – vocals 
 Tim Hauser – vocals
 Alan Paul – vocals
 Janis Siegel – vocals

Musicians
 Yaron Gershovsky – acoustic piano (1, 2, 5, 10, 11), keyboards (1, 2, 5), additional keyboards (4)
 Héctor del Curto – bandoneon (3)
 Gil Goldstein – electric piano (4, 9), acoustic piano (7, 8), accordions (9)
 John Yano – instrumental programming (6), guitars (6)
 Thomas Baraka DiCandia – lead guitar (2), guitar (9)
 Fats Kaplin – acoustic guitar (2), mandolin (2)
 Doug Livingston – pedal steel guitar (2)
 Ramesh Mishra – sarangi (2)
 John Pizzarelli – acoustic guitar (8), guitar (9)
 Will Lee – bass (1, 2, 8, 9), fretless bass (4, 7)
 Richie Goods – acoustic bass (3, 5), bass (6, 11)
 Steve Hass – drums (1, 2, 4-7, 9, 11), cowbell (1), hi-hat (2), tambourine (2), loop programming (4), additional percussion (11)
 Frank Colón – percussion (1, 3, 4, 7, 8, 11)
 Billy Hulting – percussion (7), marimba (7), vibraphone (7)
 Svet Stoyanov – bass marimba (7)
 Lew Soloff – trumpet (1, 4)
 Dave Eggar – cello (3, 8, 10)
 Lois Martin – viola (3, 10)
 Joyce Hammann – 1st violin (3, 10)
 Laura Seaton – 2nd violin (3, 10)

References / Sources

 The Manhattan Transfer Official Website

The Manhattan Transfer albums
2004 albums
Telarc Records albums